Richard Dixon is an English translator of Italian literature. He translated the last works of Umberto Eco, including his novels The Prague Cemetery, shortlisted for the Independent Foreign Fiction Prize 2012,  and Numero Zero, commended by the judges of the John Florio Prize, 2016. He has also translated works by Giacomo Leopardi, Roberto Calasso and Antonio Moresco.

Life

Richard Dixon was born in Coventry, in 1956. He was educated at King Henry VIII School and Lanchester Polytechnic, where he graduated in Business Law. He practised as a barrister in London for ten years before moving to Italy in 1989, where he now lives.

Selected translations

 The Prague Cemetery by Umberto Eco, 2011: shortlisted for the Independent Foreign Fiction Prize, 2012
 Inventing the Enemy by Umberto Eco, 2012
 Zibaldone di Pensieri by Giacomo Leopardi (with other translators), 2013
 The Combover by Adrián N. Bravi, 2013
 Author’s revisions to The Name of the Rose by Umberto Eco, 2014
 Ardor by Roberto Calasso, 2014
 The Art of the Publisher by Roberto Calasso, 2015
 Numero Zero by Umberto Eco, 2015: John Florio Prize, 2016: Commended translation 
 Dante: The Story of His Life by Marco Santagata, 2016
 Distant Light by Antonio Moresco, 2016: shortlisted for the American Literary Translators Association Italian Prose in Translation Award, 2017, shortlisted for the International Dublin Literary Award, 2018
 The Experience of Pain by Carlo Emilio Gadda, 2017  
 Chronicles of a Liquid Society by Umberto Eco, 2017
 The Ruin of Kasch by Roberto Calasso, 2018
 The Javelin Thrower by Paolo Volponi, 2019
 The Unnamable Present by Roberto Calasso, 2019
 Crossing the Rubicon: Caesar’s Decision and the Fate of Rome by Luca Fezzi, 2019
 The Celestial Hunter by Roberto Calasso, 2020
 The Lehman Trilogy by Stefano Massini, 2020
 How to Spot a Fascist by Umberto Eco (with co-translator Alastair McEwen), 2020
 Valse Triste by Marcello Fois, 2021
 The Book of Nonexistent Words by Stefano Massini, 2021
 South 1982 by Adrián N. Bravi, 2022
 Clandestinity by Antonio Moresco, 2022

He has also translated contemporary Italian poets, including Franco Buffoni and Eugenio De Signoribus

References

External links
 Umberto Eco in conversation with Richard Dixon (in Italian) at the Italian Cultural Institute London - 25 February 2012 1 2 3
 Birmingham University Zibaldone Project
 Description of Distant Light by Antonio Moresco at Archipelago Books
 Official website of Richard Dixon

Italian–English translators
21st-century British translators
Literary translators
1956 births
People from Coventry
People educated at King Henry VIII School, Coventry
Alumni of Coventry University
Living people